Cleopatra is a genus of freshwater snails with an operculum, aquatic gastropod molluscs in the family Paludomidae within the subfamily Cleopatrinae. 

Cleopatra is the type genus of the subfamily Cleopatrinae.

The diploid chromosome number of Cleopatra bulimoides is 2n=28.

Distribution 
The distribution of the species within this genus includes Egypt.

Species
The genus Cleopatra includes the following species:
 † Cleopatra adami Neiber & Glaubrecht, 2019 
 Cleopatra africana (Martens, 1878)
 †Cleopatra angulata Williamson, 1979 
 † Cleopatra arambourgi Roger, 1944 
 Cleopatra athiensis Verdcourt, 1957
 Cleopatra bulimoides (Olivier, 1804) - type species
 Cleopatra colbeaui (Craven, 1880)
 Cleopatra cridlandi Mandahl-Barth, 1954
 Cleopatra cyclostomoides
 Cleopatra cyclostomoides cyclostomoides
 Cleopatra cyclostomoides tchadiensis Germain 1907
 † Cleopatra dubia Adam, 1959 
 Cleopatra elata Dautzenberg & Germain, 1914
 Cleopatra exarata (Martens, 1878)
 Cleopatra ferruginea (I. & H. C. Lea, 1850)
 Cleopatra grandidieri (Crosse & Fischer, 1872)
 Cleopatra guillemei Bourguignat, 1885
 Cleopatra hemmingi Verdcourt, 1956
 † Cleopatra johnstoni Smith, 1893
 Cleopatra kaisoensis Van Damme & Pickford, 2003 
 Cleopatra langi Pilsbry & Bequaert, 1927
 † Cleopatra lepersonnei (Gautier, 1970) 
 Cleopatra lesnei Germain, 1935
 Cleopatra madagascariensis (Crosse & Fischer, 1872)
 Cleopatra mweruensis Smith, 1893
 Cleopatra nsendweensis Dupuis & Putzeys, 1902
 Cleopatra obscura Mandahl-Barth, 1968
 Cleopatra pilula Mandahl-Barth, 1967
 Cleopatra poutrini Lamy, 1909
 Cleopatra rugosa Connolly, 1925
 Cleopatra smithi Ancey, 1906
 † Cleopatra vanloockei Van Damme & Pickford, 2003 
Taxa inquirenda
 Cleopatra clara Pilsbry & Bequaert, 1927 
 Cleopatra congener Preston, 1913 
 Cleopatra laurenti Bourguignat, 1879 
 Cleopatra lhotellerii Bourguignat, 1879 
 Cleopatra mareotica Bourguignat, 1879 
 Cleopatra percarinata Bourguignat, 1885 
 Cleopatra raymondi Bourguignat, 1879 
 Cleopatra soleilleti Bourguignat, 1885 
Species brought into synonymy
 Cleopatra broecki Putzeys, 1899 - synonym: Potadomoides broecki (Putzeys, 1899)
 Cleopatra cameroni Bourguignat, 1879: synonym of Cleopatra ferruginea (I. Lea & H. C. Lea, 1851)
 Cleopatra pauli Bourguignat, 1885: synonym of Cleopatra bulimoides (Olivier, 1804)

Ecology 
The habitat of species in this genus includes slow-running freshwater streams.

Parasites of Cleopatra include:
 Serves as an intermediate host for Prohemistomum vivax.

References

 Brown D.S. (1994). Freshwater snails of Africa and their medical importance, 2nd edition. London: Taylor and Francis, 607 p.
page(s): 129

Further reading
Yasseen A. E. (1994). "Chromosomal studies of freshwater snail Cleopatra bulimoides common in upper Egypt". Cytologia 59: 317-322.

External links

Paludomidae